Momiji (Japanese 紅葉) is a female oni (kijo) in Japanese folklore, whose story is known as The Legend of Momiji (紅葉伝説). It is a story about  fighting and defeating the kijo named Momiji.

History  

A common element of many versions of the legend is that the demon lives on Mount Togakushi, a mountain in Shinano Province, and it is defeated and killed by Taira no Koremochi. The demon is a female oni (a kijo) named Momiji (Maple Leaves). The play "Momijigari" was created in the latter half of the Muromachi period, and it is widely believed that there was a legend that was originally used as a material (many legends of demons remain on Mt. Togakushi). It is a well-established theory that it was created by Nobumitsu. Legendary sites remain around Togakushi, but they are believed to be established after this legend.

There are many legends about Mount Togakushi, talking about various other yokai, distinct from Momiji. For example, Mount Togakushi has been blessed by the Nine-Headed Dragon God and is a location of religious worship for practitioners of Shugendō, and the nearby Mount Iizuna is famous for being a land that is overflowing with the black magic arts of those whose faith resides in the Tengu.

Between the Muromachi period and the Edo period, Noh, Jōruri, and Kabuki works named "Momijigari" were created. In Kabuki play "Momijigari" (1887) by Kawatake Mokuami, which was based on the Noh version, the name of the maple leaf kijo is Sarashinahime/Princess Sarashina (更科姫). 

In 1930 a detailed version of the Momiji legend, which describes her life and origins in detail has been published in "Daigoen" (大語園) and later versions would primarily base on it.

Legend variants 
In the Meiji era book , Momiji is a descendant of the Ōtomo clan and blessed by the Demon King of The Sixth Heaven with beauty and many talents. As a child she was named Kureha (呉葉 or 呉羽), but at the age of 16 changed her name to Momiji/Kōyō and moved to the capital city. In the capital, she drew attention of Minamoto no Tsunemoto and his midaidokoro (official wife). Despite that, she was later suspected of devising a plot to kill the midaidokoro with a curse. Initially she was sentenced to death, but as she was already pregnant with Tsunemoto's child, she was exiled to Shinano Province instead. She settled in the Minase Village (later called Kinasa, meaning "the village of no demons") there and got accepted by the locals, but eventually she ended up feared as the leader of the surrounding area’s outlaws, nicknamed “Kijo”. The bandit gang was defeated by the army of Taira no Koremochi, with Emperor Reizei issuing an edict dispatching them. In order to defeat the Kijo in battle Taira no Koremochi offered up a prayer to the gods and was bestowed with the Demon Conquering Spirit Sword (Gouma no Reiken). With the sword in hand he was finally able to defeat Momiji after attacking her while she was alone and he was dressed up as a traveling monk.

The Kinasa version is slightly different. The village tradition says that Momiji was a victim of midaidokoro's jealousy. Living in Minase village, Momiji would heal the villagers' illnesses, teach men reading and writing and arithmetic, teach women sewing, and would be generally loved by the villagers as an elegant lady conveying the culture of Kyoto. Grateful villagers built her "Dairi mansion" (内裏屋敷) to remind her of Kyoto and the Imperial Palace (dairi). Furthermore, Kinasa folklore dates the legend: 16 year old Kureha comes to Kyoto in year 953 (Tenryaku 6) and is exiled aged 19 in 956.

According to  the ghost of Momiji became Hiyoshi Gongen (日吉権現) who protects .

In some versions Momiji is the wife of The Great King of oni, .

Notes

References

Bibliography 
 
 
 
 
 
 

Oni
Japanese legends
Shinano Province